There are about 510 known moth species of Namibia. The moths (mostly nocturnal) and butterflies (mostly diurnal) together make up the taxonomic order Lepidoptera.

This is a list of moth species which have been recorded in Namibia.

Amphisbatidae
Paratemelia meyi Lvovsky, 2007
Paratemelia namibiella Lvovsky, 2007

Arctiidae
Afrospilarctia flavida (Bartel, 1903)
Alpenus whalleyi Watson, 1988
Amata alicia (Butler, 1876)
Amata damarensis (Grünberg, 1910)
Amerila bauri Möschler, 1884
Amerila bubo (Walker, 1855)
Amsacta melanogastra (Holland, 1897)
Apisa canescens Walker, 1855
Apisa hildae Kiriakoff, 1961
Cymaroa grisea (Thunberg, 1784)
Eilema albostriatum Kühne, 2010
Epilacydes simulans Butler, 1875
Epilacydes unistriga (Grünberg, 1910)
Eyralpenus scioana (Oberthür, 1880)
Galtara nepheloptera (Hampson, 1910)
Meneclia pallidula Grünberg, 1910
Micralarctia australis Watson, 1988
Micralarctia punctulatum (Wallengren, 1860)
Owambarctia owamboensis Kiriakoff, 1957
Paralacydes arborifera (Butler, 1875)
Paralacydes destrictus Kühne, 2010
Paralacydes jeskei (Grünberg, 1911)
Paramaenas affinis (Rothschild, 1933)
Paramaenas strigosus Grünberg, 1911
Phlyctaenogastra britae Kühne, 2010
Phlyctaenogastra familia Kühne, 2010
Phlyctaenogastra rangei Gaede, 1915
Saenura flava Wallengren, 1860
Spilosoma lineata Walker, 1855
Teracotona rhodophaea (Walker, 1865)
Teracotona submacula (Walker, 1855)
Thumatha punctata Kühne, 2010
Thyretes caffra Wallengren, 1863
Thyretes negus Oberthür, 1878
Utetheisa pulchella (Linnaeus, 1758)

Autostichidae
Hesperesta rhyodes (Meyrick, 1909)
Turatia turpicula Gozmány, 2000

Carposinidae
Carposina longipalpalis Mey, 2007
Meridarchis regalis Mey, 2007

Cecidosidae
Scyrotis alticolaria Mey, 2007
Scyrotis brandbergensis Mey, 2007
Scyrotis namakarooensis Mey, 2007

Choreutidae
Choreutis aegyptiaca (Zeller, 1867)
Tebenna micalis (Mann, 1857)

Copromorphidae
Rhynchoferella syncentra (Meyrick, 1916)

Cosmopterigidae
Gisilia conformata (Meyrick, 1921)
Gisilia meyi Sinev, 2007
Gisilia sclerodes (Meyrick, 1909)
Gisilia stagnans (Meyrick, 1921)
Gisilia stereodoxa (Meyrick, 1925)

Cossidae
Aethalopteryx forsteri (Clench, 1959)
Aethalopteryx squameus (Distant, 1902)
Aethalopteryx tristis (Gaede, 1915)
Arctiocossus antargyreus Felder, 1874
Arctiocossus danieli Clench, 1959
Arctiocossus poliopterus Clench, 1959
Arctiocossus strigulatus Gaede, 1929
Arctiocossus tessellatus Clench, 1959
Azygophleps asylas (Cramer, 1777)
Azygophleps inclusa (Walker, 1856)
Azygophleps leopardina Distant, 1902
Azygophleps liturata (Aurivillius, 1879)
Brachylia eutelia Clench, 1959
Brachylia terebroides Felder, 1874
Eulophonotus myrmeleon Felder, 1874
Macrocossus coelebs Clench, 1959
Macrocossus toluminus (Druce, 1887)
Nomima deserticola Mey, 2007
Nomima gaerdesi Mey, 2007
Nomima montisusti Mey, 2007
Nomima prophanes Durrant, 1916
Pecticossus gaerdesi Daniel, 1956
Phragmataecia andarana Clench, 1959
Phragmataecia irrorata Hampson, 1910
Phragmataecia okovangae Clench, 1959
Pseudurgis maacki Mey, 2007
Rethona strigosa Walker, 1855
Xyleutes dictyotephra Clench, 1959

Crambidae
Glyphodes amphipeda (Meyrick, 1939)
Heliothela ophideresana (Walker, 1863)
Nomophila noctuella ([Denis & Schiffermüller], 1775)
Pyrausta grisealis Maes, 2009

Elachistidae
Phthinostoma maculata Mey, 2007
Phthinostoma taeniata Mey, 2007

Eriocottidae
Compsoctena araeopis (Meyrick, 1926)
Compsoctena brandbergensis Mey, 2007
Compsoctena leucoconis (Meyrick, 1926)

Eupterotidae
Jana eurymas Herrich-Schäffer, 1854
Phiala costipuncta (Herrich-Schäffer, 1855)
Trichophiala devylderi Aurivillius, 1879

Gelechiidae
Acutitornus munda Janse, 1951
Allotelphusa lathridia (Meyrick, 1909)
Anarsia agricola Walsingham, 1891
Anarsia nimbosa Meyrick, 1913
Argophara epaxia Janse, 1963
Aspades hutchinsonella (Walsingham, 1891)
Athrips albibasella Bidzilya, 2010
Athrips albicostella Bidzilya, 2010
Athrips angustisaccula Bidzilya, 2010
Athrips bruneosparsa Janse, 1958
Athrips dorsimaculata Bidzilya, 2010
Athrips flavida Bidzilya, 2010
Athrips hirtopalpa Bidzilya, 2010
Athrips latipalpella Bidzilya, 2010
Athrips mappigera Meyrick, 1914
Athrips meyi Bidzilya, 2010
Athrips neograpta Meyrick, 1914
Athrips nigrinervosa Bidzilya, 2010
Athrips pallida Bidzilya, 2010
Athrips phoenaula (Meyrick, 1913)
Athrips punctosa Bidzilya, 2010
Athrips ravidinigra Bidzilya, 2010
Ephysteris promptella (Staudinger, 1859)
Gelechia sematica (Meyrick, 1913)
Hedma microcasis (Meyrick, 1929)
Hedma rhamnifoliae (Amsel & Hering, 1931)
Hypatima austerodes (Meyrick, 1918)
Lacistodes tauropis Meyrick, 1921
Leuronoma oenochyta (Meyrick, 1921)
Metzneria brandbergi Janse, 1963
Microcraspedus synecta (Meyrick, 1909)
Neotelphusa ochlerodes (Meyrick, 1925)
Neotelphusa phaeomacula Janse, 1958
Ochrodia pentamacula (Janse, 1958)
Ochrodia subdiminutella (Stainton, 1867)
Octonodula binotella Janse, 1951
Ornativalva kalahariensis (Janse, 1960)
Parapsectris alfonsi Bidzilya, 2010
Parapsectris curvisaccula Bidzilya, 2010
Parapsectris fastidiosa Meyrick, 1911
Parapsectris griseoflavida Bidzilya, 2010
Parapsectris lacunosa (Meyrick, 1918)
Parapsectris modica Bidzilya, 2010
Parapsectris nigrifasciata Bidzilya, 2010
Parapsectris ochrocosma (Meyrick, 1911)
Parapsectris ochrostigma Bidzilya, 2010
Parapsectris savannae Bidzilya, 2010
Parapsectris tholaea Meyrick, 1911
Parapsectris violae Bidzilya, 2010
Paratelphusa reducta Janse, 1958
Parathectis sordidula (Meyrick, 1913)
Polyhymno chionarcha Meyrick, 1913
Polyhymno eurydoxa Meyrick, 1909
Polyhymno hostilis Meyrick, 1918
Polyhymno palinorsa Meyrick, 1909
Polyhymno pausimacha Meyrick, 1909
Schizovalva exoenota Meyrick, 1918
Scrobipalpa aptatella (Walker, 1864)
Scrobipalpa diversa (Janse, 1950)
Scrobipalpa ergasima (Meyrick, 1916)
Scrobipalpa vicaria (Meyrick, 1921)
Stomopteryx eremopis (Meyrick, 1921)
Streyella pallidigrisea Janse, 1958
Syncopacma oxyspila (Meyrick, 1909)
Syncopacma polychromella (Rebel, 1902)

Geometridae
Allochrostes uniornata Prout, 1935
Androzeugma subacuta Prout, 1935
Chiasmia brongusaria (Walker, 1860)
Chiasmia diarmodia (Prout, 1925)
Chiasmia getula (Wallengren, 1872)
Chiasmia grimmia (Wallengren, 1872)
Drepanogynis albiordine Prout, 1938
Drepanogynis gynoloxa (Prout, 1938)
Drepanogynis incondita (Warren, 1904)
Drepanogynis olivescens (Warren, 1898)
Mimoclystia corticearia (Aurivillius, 1910)
Rhodophthitus tricoloraria (Mabille, 1890)
Zamarada ascaphes Prout, 1925
Zamarada ilma Prout, 1922
Zamarada metallicata Warren, 1914
Zamarada phaeozona Hampson, 1909
Zamarada pulverosa Warren, 1895
Zamarada tosta D. S. Fletcher, 1974

Gracillariidae
Acrocercops ficina Vári, 1961
Acrocercops terminalina Vári, 1961
Africephala timaea (Meyrick, 1914)
Apistoneura psarochroma Vári, 1961
Aspilapteryx filifera (Meyrick, 1912)
Callicercops triceros (Meyrick, 1926)
Caloptilia cataractias (Meyrick, 1921)
Caloptilia cryphia Vári, 1961
Caloptilia isotoma (Meyrick, 1914)
Caloptilia pentaplaca (Meyrick, 1911)
Caloptilia porphyranthes (Meyrick, 1921)
Caloptilia sapina Vári, 1961
Caloptilia sychnospila Vári, 1961
Caloptilia verecunda Triberti, 2004
Conopobathra carbunculata (Meyrick, 1912)
Conopobathra geraea Vári, 1961
Conopobathra gravissima (Meyrick, 1912)
Conopobathra plethorhabda Vári, 1961
Conopomorpha chionosema Vári, 1961
Conopomorpha euphanes Vári, 1961
Cryptolectica euryphanta (Meyrick, 1911)
Cuphodes melanostola (Meyrick, 1918)
Dysectopa scalifera Vári, 1961
Ectropina ligata (Meyrick, 1912)
Epicephala homostola Vári, 1961
Epicephala pyrrhogastra Meyrick, 1908
Graphiocephala barbitias (Meyrick, 1909)
Pareclectis hobohmi Vári, 1961
Phyllonorycter chionopa (Vári, 1961)
Phyllonorycter didymopa (Vári, 1961)
Phyllonorycter grewiaecola (Vári, 1961)
Phyllonorycter grewiella (Vári, 1961)
Phyllonorycter leucaspis Triberti, 2004
Stomphastis cardamitis (Meyrick, 1921)
Stomphastis crotonis Vári, 1961
Stomphastis rorkei Vári, 1961
Stomphastis thraustica (Meyrick, 1908)
Stomphastis tremina Vári, 1961

Lasiocampidae
Anadiasa punctifascia Walker, 1855
Beralade jordani Tams, 1936
Bombycomorpha bifascia (Walker, 1855)
Braura picturata (Grünberg, 1910)
Chrysopsyche bivittata Aurivillius, 1927
Gonometa postica Walker, 1855
Metajana chanleri Holland, 1896
Odontocheilopteryx obscura Aurivillius, 1927
Philotherma rosa (Druce, 1887)
Rhinobombyx cuneata Aurivillius, 1879
Schausinna regia (Grünberg, 1910)
Sena meyi Zolotuhin, 2007
Sena parva (Aurivillius, 1921)
Sena prompta (Walker, 1855)
Sena quirimbo (Tams, 1936)
Streblote pancala (Tams, 1936)

Lecithoceridae
Dragmatucha proaula Meyrick, 1908
Lecithocera ideologa Meyrick, 1937

Limacodidae
Afrobirthama hobohmi Janse, 1964
Coenobasis argentilinea Aurivillius, 1900
Isozinara pallidifascia Janse, 1964
Latoia eremotropha Janse, 1964
Pseudothosea albisignata Janse, 1964
Scotinochroa diplothysana Tams, 1932
Taeda aetitis Wallengren, 1863

Lymantriidae
Bazisa transmutata Mey, 2007
Crorema adspersa (Herrich-Schäffer, 1854)
Crorema nigropunctata Collenette, 1931
Crorema ochracea (Snellen, 1872)
Euproctis consocia Walker, 1865
Euproctis niropunctatum Kühne, 2010
Homochira rendalli (Distant, 1897)
Lacipa kottleri Kühne, 2010
Laelia actuosa Hering, 1926
Laelia amabilis Aurivillius, 1879
Laelia extatura (Distant, 1897)
Laelia extorta (Distant, 1897)
Laelia gwelila (Swinhoe, 1903)
Laelioproctis leucosphena Collenette, 1939
Lymantica cidariensis Kühne, 2010
Rhypopteryx diplogramma Hering, 1927
Rhypopteryx sordida Aurivillius, 1879
Tearosoma aspersum Felder, 1874
Tearosoma daures Mey, 2007

Metarbelidae
Arbelodes dupreezi Lehmann, 2010
Arbelodes heringi (Janse, 1930)
Arbelodes kroonae Lehmann, 2007
Kroonia heikeae Lehmann, 2010
Kroonia honeyi Lehmann, 2010
Metarbela kobesi Lehmann, 2007
Metarbela naumanni Mey, 2005
Metarbela trisignata Gaede, 1929
Metarbela weinmanni Lehmann, 2007
Salagena meyi Lehmann, 2007
Teragra cammae Lehmann, 2007

Noctuidae
Achaea tolnaodes Berio, 1956
Acontia annemaria Hacker, 2007
Acontia antica Walker, 1862
Acontia aureola Hacker, 2007
Acontia aurivillii Hacker, Legrain & Fibiger, 2010
Acontia chrysoproctis (Hampson, 1902)
Acontia cimbebasia Hacker, 2007
Acontia conifrons (Aurivillius, 1879)
Acontia discoidea Hopffer, 1857
Acontia ectorrida (Hampson, 1916)
Acontia gratiosa Wallengren, 1856
Acontia guttifera Felder & Rogenhofer, 1874
Acontia imitatrix Wallengren, 1856
Acontia insocia (Walker, 1857)
Acontia namibiensis Hacker, Legrain & Fibiger, 2008
Acontia natalis (Guenée, 1852)
Acontia okahandja Hacker, Legrain & Fibiger, 2008
Acontia opalinoides Guenée, 1852
Acontia permutata Hacker, Legrain & Fibiger, 2008
Acontia porphyrea (Butler, 1898)
Acontia simo Wallengren, 1860
Acontia spangbergi Aurivillius, 1879
Acontia torrefacta (Distant, 1898)
Acontia transfigurata Wallengren, 1856
Acontia trimaculata Aurivillius, 1879
Acontia trychaenoides Wallengren, 1856
Acontia umbrigera Felder & Rogenhofer, 1874
Acontia wahlbergi Wallengren, 1856
Acontia wallengreni Aurivillius, 1879
Acontia wolframmeyi Hacker, 2007
Aegle dubiosa Kühne, 2010
Asplenia melanodonta (Hampson, 1896)
Audea melanoplaga Hampson, 1902
Brevipecten brandbergensis Hacker, 2004
Brevipecten cornuta Hampson, 1902
Brevipecten wolframmeyi Hacker & Fibiger, 2007
Ctenusa pallida (Hampson, 1902)
Ctenusa varians (Wallengren, 1863)
Cucullia terensis Felder & Rogenhofer, 1874
Cyligramma latona (Cramer, 1775)
Diaphone eumela (Stoll, 1781)
Dysmilichia namibiae Hacker, 2007
Eustrotia genuflexa (Hampson, 1902)
Grammodes stolida (Fabricius, 1775)
Heraclia abacata (Karsch, 1892)
Heraclia lomata (Karsch, 1892)
Heraclia longipennis (Walker, 1854)
Honeyia clearchus (Fawcett, 1916)
Honeyia quarta Hacker & Fibiger, 2007
Hypena senialis Guenée, 1854
Hypersypnoides congoensis Berio, 1954
Iambiodes incerta (Rothschild, 1913)
Masalia disticta (Hampson, 1902)
Masalia leucosticta (Hampson, 1902)
Masalia quilengesi Seymour, 1972
Omphaloceps daria (Druce, 1895)
Ophiusa dianaris (Guenée, 1852)
Ophiusa umbrilinea Hampson, 1902
Oraesia emarginata (Fabricius, 1794)
Oraesia provocans Walker, [1858]
Ozarba acclivis (Felder & Rogenhofer, 1874)
Ozarba cinerea (Aurivillius, 1879)
Ozarba damarensis Berio, 1940
Ozarba devylderi Berio, 1940
Ozarba gaedei Berio, 1940
Ozarba gobabis Berio, 1940
Ozarba inopinata Berio, 1940
Ozarba jansei Berio, 1940
Ozarba malaisei Berio, 1940
Ozarba persinua Berio, 1940
Paida pulchra (Trimen, 1863)
Plecopterodes lutosa (Grünberg, 1910)
Polydesma umbricola Boisduval, 1833
Proschaliphora albida Hampson, 1909
Proschaliphora aurata Kühne, 2010
Proschaliphora lineata Kühne, 2010
Proschaliphora minima Kühne, 2010
Sphingomorpha chlorea (Cramer, 1777)
Stenosticta namibiensis Hacker & Mey, 2010
Stenosticta nigrescens Hacker & Mey, 2010
Stenosticta virgata Hacker & Mey, 2010
Thiacidas duplicata (Grünberg, 1910)
Thiacidas krooni Hacker & Zilli, 2007
Thiacidas permutata Hacker & Zilli, 2007
Thiacidas postalbida (Gaede, 1939)
Thiacidas roseotincta (Pinhey, 1962)
Ulochlaena ferruginea (Gaede, 1915)
Ulochlaena reducta (Gaede, 1915)
Ulochlaena sagittata (Gaede, 1915)
Ulochlaena schaeferi Gaede, 1915

Nolidae
Arcyophora ledereri (Wallengren, 1863)
Neaxestis aviuncis Wiltshire, 1985

Notodontidae
Afroplitis dasychirina (Gaede, 1928)
Afroplitis pylades (Kiriakoff, 1955)
Antheuella psolometopa (Tams, 1929)
Atrasana grisea (Gaede, 1928)
Cerurina marshalli (Hampson, 1910)
Metopteryx mus (Gaede, 1928)
Phalera atrata (Grünberg, 1907)
Phalera lydenburgi Distant, 1899
Phyllaliodes poliostrota (Hampson, 1910)
Stenostaura elegans Kiriakoff, 1970

Oecophoridae
Stathmopoda ficivora Kasy, 1973

Plutellidae
Paraxenistis serrata Mey, 2007
Plutella xylostella (Linnaeus, 1758)

Psychidae
Australoplacodoma bicolorata Sobczyk & Mey, 2007
Chalia maledicta Scheven, 1910
Eumeta cervina Druce, 1887
Kotochalia junodi (Heylaerts, 1890)
Lithopleurota monachopis Meyrick, 1939
Narycia antibatis Meyrick, 1926
Narycia isoxantha Meyrick, 1920
Patromasia petroglypta Meyrick, 1926
Penestoglossa dyscrita Meyrick, 1926
Picrospora maculasquamosa Sobczyk & Mey, 2007
Placodoma brandbergensis Sobczyk & Mey, 2007
Thranitica hemicopa Meyrick, 1908

Pterophoridae
Agdistis lomholdti Gielis, 1990
Agdistis namibiana Arenberger, 1988
Agdistis pala Arenberger, 1986
Agdistis piccolo Gielis, 1990
Agdistis spinosa Arenberger, 1986
Agdistis swakopi Arenberger, 2009
Agdistis tsumkwe Arenberger, 2001
Hellinsia brandbergi Arenberger, 2004
Marasmarcha verax (Meyrick, 1909)
Megalorhipida leucodactylus (Fabricius, 1794)
Pterophorus rhyparias (Meyrick, 1908)

Pyralidae
Abachausia grisea Balinsky, 1994
Acrobasis africanella Balinsky, 1994
Aglossa phaealis Hampson, 1906
Aglossa rhodalis Hampson, 1906
Aglossa tinealis Leraut, 2007
Ancylosis atrisparsella (Hampson, 1901)
Ancylosis glaphyria Balinsky, 1987
Ancylosis interjectella (Ragonot, 1888)
Ancylosis namibiella Balinsky, 1987
Ancylosis ocellella (Hampson, 1901)
Ancylosis subpyrethrella (Ragonot, 1888)
Arsissa transvaalica Balinsky, 1991
Cadra figulilella (Gregson, 1871)
Ceutholopha isidis (Zeller, 1867)
Delopterus basalis Janse, 1922
Epicrocis nigrinella (Balinsky, 1994)
Epicrocis picta (Balinsky, 1991)
Epilepia melanobasis (Hampson, 1906)
Epilepia melanobrunnea (Janse, 1922)
Epilepia meyi Speidel, 2007
Episindris albimaculalis Ragonot, 1891
Etiella zinckenella (Treitschke, 1832)
Euzopherodes capicola Balinsky, 1994
Faveria dionysia (Zeller, 1846)
Hypargyria metalliferella Ragonot, 1888
Hypotia brandbergensis Leraut, 2007
Hypotia decembralis Leraut, 2007
Hypotia dinteri Grünberg, 1910
Hypotia eberti Leraut, 2007
Hypotia meyi Leraut, 2007
Hypotia namibiensis Leraut, 2007
Loryma sinuosalis Leraut, 2007
Namibina namibicola Leraut, 2007
Namibiodes brandbergensis Leraut, 2007
Pithyllis metachryseis (Hampson, 1906)
Pithyllis pallidalis Leraut, 2007
Pseudozitha alticolalis Leraut, 2007
Pyralosis polycyclophora (Hampson, 1916)
Scotomera fuliginosalis Leraut, 2007
Staudingeria mimeugraphella Balinsky, 1989
Synaphe fuscochralis Leraut, 2007
Thylacoptila paurosema Meyrick, 1885
Tyndis namibiensis Leraut, 2007
Veldticola megista Hampson, 1930

Saturniidae
Epiphora bauhiniae (Guérin-Méneville, 1832)
Gynanisa maja (Klug, 1836)
Gynanisa zimba Darge, 2008
Heniocha apollonia (Cramer, 1779)
Heniocha distincta Bryk, 1939
Heniocha dyops (Maassen, 1872)
Ludia corticea Jordan, 1922
Ludia delegorguei (Boisduval, 1847)
Pseudobunaea tyrrhena (Westwood, 1849)
Usta wallengrenii (C. & R. Felder, 1859)

Sesiidae
Echidgnathia khomasana de Freina, 2011
Melittia aurociliata (Aurivillius, 1879)

Sphingidae
Acherontia atropos (Linnaeus, 1758)
Agrius convolvuli (Linnaeus, 1758)
Hippotion celerio (Linnaeus, 1758)
Hippotion rosae (Butler, 1882)
Hoplistopus penricei Rothschild & Jordan, 1903
Hyles livornica (Esper, 1780)
Nephele comma Hopffer, 1857
Oligographa juniperi (Boisduval, 1847)
Phylloxiphia punctum (Rothschild, 1907)
Polyptychoides grayii (Walker, 1856)
Pseudoclanis diana Gehlen, 1922
Rufoclanis numosae (Wallengren, 1860)

Thyrididae
Arniocera amoena Jordan, 1907
Arniocera cyanoxantha (Mabille, 1893)
Bupota galbana Whalley, 1971
Chrysotypus subflavus Whalley, 1971
Dysodia incognita Whalley, 1968
Dysodia intermedia (Walker, 1865)
Dysodia subsignata Warren, 1908
Rhodoneura abacha Whalley, 1971

Tineidae
Ceratophaga vastellus (Zeller, 1852)
Probatostola ochromalla Meyrick, 1926
Tinea melancholica Gozmány, 1967
Tinea roesleri Gozmány, 1969
Tracheloteina virgo Gozmány, 1967
Trichophaga cuspidata Gozmány, 1967

Tischeriidae
Coptotriche africana Puplesis & Diskus, 2003
Tischeria antilope Puplesis, Diškus & Mey, 2003
Tischeria sparmanniae Puplesis & Diškus, 2003

Tortricidae
Bactra tylophora Diakonoff, 1963
Cydia ichthyura (Meyrick, 1926)
Cydia malesana (Meyrick, 1920)
Eccopsis incultana (Walker, 1863)
Eugnosta cataracta Aarvik, 2004
Eugnosta meyi Aarvik, 2004
Eugnosta namibiana Aarvik, 2004
Megalota namibiana Aarvik, 2004
Metendothenia balanacma (Meyrick, 1914)
Selania costifuscana Aarvik, 2004
Thiodia excavana Aarvik, 2004

Uraniidae
Pseudodirades lactea (Warren, 1897)

Xyloryctidae
Scythris camelella Walsingham, 1907
Scythris fluctuosa Meyrick, 1914
Scythris kebirella Amsel, 1935
Scythris stagnosa Meyrick, 1913

Yponomeutidae
Prays oleae (Bernard, 1788)
Yponomeuta subplumbellus Walsingham, 1881

Zygaenidae
Zutulba namaqua (Boisduval, 1847)

References

External links 
 

Moths
Moths
Namibia
Namibia